Summer Advantage USA is a national non-profit organization providing elementary and middle school students living in low–performing school districts with research-based summer learning programs focused on academic gains.

Overview and history
Summer Advantage USA was launched in January 2009 in Indiana by Earl Martin Phalen, who founded the organization in September 2008 and is its CEO.

Phalen originally cofounded a community service outreach organization known as BELL (Building Educated Leaders for Life) in June 1993.

References

External links
Summer Advantage USA website

2009 establishments in Indiana
Educational organizations based in the United States
Alternative education
Summer schools
Experiential learning